Kenneth W. Parchman (born in Jackson, Tennessee on January 15, 1932; died near Madison, Tennessee on June 2, 1999) was a rockabilly musician associated to Sun Records. Although largely forgotten in his native US, he developed a following in Europe. He was survived by Lorene Parchman, his wife of 38 years.

References 

American rockabilly musicians
Sun Records artists
People from Jackson, Tennessee
1932 births
1999 deaths
20th-century American musicians
Country musicians from Tennessee